Events from the year 1640 in Denmark.

Incumbents 
 Monarch – Christian IV

Events 

Børsen (the stock exchange in Copenhagen) completed

Births 
1 April – Georg Mohr, mathematician (died 1697)

Deaths 
 6 October – Christian Ulrik Gyldenløve, military officer and diplomat (born 1611).

References 

 
Denmark
Years of the 17th century in Denmark